Pristimantis luscombei is a species of frog in the family Strabomantidae. It is known from north-eastern Peru (Loreto, Amazonas, and Ucayali Regions), adjacent Amazonian Ecuador (Pastaza and Morona-Santiago Provinces), and from Acre state, Brazil. Some of the paratypes were later identified as belonging to another species, described in 2014 as Pristimantis miktos. At the same time, Pristimantis achuar was identified as synonym of Pristimantis luscombei.

Description
Adult males measure  and females  in snout–vent length. There is a W-shaped, usually black dermal ridge in the scapular region. The dorsum is light to medium brown whereas the venter is immaculate yellowish white. The iris is bronze with black reticulation and with a reddish median stripe. Dorsal skin is smooth to finely shagreen. Pristimantis luscombei resembles Pristimantis kichwarum, but lacks the dark canthal stripe of the latter and has a blunter snout.

Habitat and conservation
It is probably locally threatened by habitat loss.

References

luscombei
Amphibians of Brazil
Amphibians of Ecuador
Amphibians of Peru
Amphibians described in 1995
Taxa named by William Edward Duellman
Taxonomy articles created by Polbot